Torrey Charles Mitchell (born January 30, 1985) is a former Canadian professional ice hockey centerman.  He spent 12 years playing professional hockey with the San Jose Sharks, the Minnesota Wild, the Buffalo Sabres, the Montreal Canadiens and the Los Angeles Kings of the National Hockey League (NHL) as well as playing in Europe with Lausanne HC of the National League (NL). He was originally drafted by the San Jose Sharks in the fourth round, 126th overall, of the 2004 NHL Entry Draft.

Playing career

Amateur
Mitchell graduated from Selwyn House School and The Hotchkiss School before he attended the University of Vermont. During his Junior year at Vermont, he served as co-captain of the Catamounts. After the Catamounts' 2006–07 season, Mitchell left the school and played in the American Hockey League (AHL) for the Worcester Sharks. On March 31, 2007, Mitchell scored his first AHL goal against the Houston Aeros in a 7–3 victory.

Professional

San Jose Sharks
In the summer of 2007, Mitchell attended the San Jose Sharks' training camp, and on October 4, 2007, he played his first NHL game against the Edmonton Oilers. He scored his first NHL goal on November 9, 2007, against Jean-Sébastien Giguère of the rival Anaheim Ducks. During that season, Mitchell spent most of his time playing on the third line with Patrick Rissmiller and Mike Grier, becoming a penalty-killing specialist with the Sharks. Mitchell also became a favourite among Shark fans when he scored a memorable goal in a game against the Ducks. The Sharks were killing a penalty, and Mitchell was able to grab the puck on a breakaway and score on Giguère while defenceman Mathieu Schneider was hooking from behind, even forcing Mitchell to fall on the ice before Mitchell got up and scored the goal. On April 10, 2008, Mitchell scored his first career NHL playoff goal in the second game of the first round series against the Calgary Flames, assisted by Ryane Clowe and Craig Rivet.

On September 21, 2008, during an open team practice, Mitchell was pushed by Brett Westgarth while skating full speed towards the net. He slammed into the right goal post and suffered a complete, non-displaced tibia/fibula fracture, commonly known as a "boot top fracture." The original estimate for his return to the ice was a minimum of two months after the incident. He resumed skating with the Sharks in practice in January 2009. He resumed play with a planned three-game conditioning assignment to the American Hockey League Worcester Sharks on January 16, 2009, but he suffered another injury to the same leg during play on January 18.  He missed the remainder of the regular season, later making his season debut in the Sharks third playoff game.

After a 2008–09 season marred by injury, Mitchell became a restricted free agent in the off-season, eventually re-signing with the Sharks on a three-year, $4.1 million contract.

Minnesota Wild
On July 1, 2012, Mitchell signed as a free agent to a three-year contract with the Minnesota Wild. Due to the 2012–13 NHL lockout, however, Mitchell signed a standard contract with the San Francisco Bulls of the ECHL on December 31, 2012. He played his first official game as a Bull two days later and scored the only regulation goal for the team at their home arena, the Cow Palace, in a 2–1 shootout loss.

Buffalo Sabres
On March 5, 2014, Mitchell was traded to the Buffalo Sabres, along with a second-round draft pick in 2014 and a second-round pick in 2016 (traded to Montreal for Josh Gorges), in exchange for Matt Moulson and Cody McCormick. Mitchell finished the season with 2 goals and 10 points in 67 games.

Montreal Canadiens
In the following 2014–15 season, Mitchell was again moved at the NHL trade deadline – he was shipped to the Montreal Canadiens in exchange for Jack Nevins and a seventh-round draft pick in 2016 on March 2, 2015.

On June 15, 2015, Mitchell signed a three-year contract to remain with the Canadiens for a reported $3.6 million.

Los Angeles Kings
During the 2017–18 season, having played in 11 scoreless games in his fourth year within the Canadiens, Mitchell was traded to the Los Angeles Kings in exchange for a conditional fifth-round pick on November 23, 2017. In assuming a checking-line role with the Kings, Mitchell appeared in 49 games, registering 6 goals and 11 points.

Lausanne HC
As a free agent from the Kings, Mitchell opted to embark on a career abroad, agreeing to a one-year contract in Switzerland, worth CHF 700,000 with Lausanne HC of the National League (NL) on July 17, 2018. After only appearing in 28 regular season games (12 points) with Lausanne in 2018/19 and playing for Team Canada in the 2018 Spengler Cup, Mitchell's season came to an abrupt end suffering a career ending concussion in mid-January 2019. 

In November 2019, he announced his retirement from professional hockey after receiving a concussion.

Personal life

Mitchell’s father Steve was athletic director of Selwyn House School which Mitchell attended. His mother Sheila was a physical-education instructor at Champlain College Lennoxville. His older brother Josh is a high-school teacher and hockey coach at Heritage Regional High School in St-Hubert.

After retiring from playing professional hockey, Mitchell started a hockey training company and built a facility in Essex, Vermont with former University of Vermont teammate Peter Lenes. Mitchell has had a house in Vermont since 2010. He lives there with his wife Brindy and their three daughters.

Career statistics

Awards and honours

References

External links

1985 births
Living people
Anglophone Quebec people
Buffalo Sabres players
Canadian ice hockey centres
Hotchkiss School alumni
Ice hockey people from Quebec
Lausanne HC players
Los Angeles Kings players
Minnesota Wild players
Montreal Canadiens players
San Francisco Bulls players
San Jose Sharks draft picks
San Jose Sharks players
Sportspeople from Longueuil
University of Vermont alumni
Vermont Catamounts men's ice hockey players
Worcester Sharks players
Canadian expatriate ice hockey players in Switzerland